He Was Her Man is a 1934 American pre-Code mob film starring James Cagney, Joan Blondell, and Victor Jory.  The film was directed by Lloyd Bacon.

Plot
Flicker Hayes (Cagney) informs the police after he sets up two men to be caught in a phony robbery attempt, because they were responsible for his going to prison. Dan Curly escapes, but the other kills a policeman and goes to the chair, so Dan wants two hitmen to get Flicker, who plans to leave the country. But he meets down-and-out Rose Lawrence (Blondell), an ex-prostitute looking to hitch a ride to a small fishing village in the south to marry a Portuguese fisherman, and Flicker decides it would be a nice place to hide. After he seduces Rose, Flicker stakes her to a bus ticket and goes with her. But he's been spotted by Pop Sims, who follows them and reports Flicker's whereabouts to Dan. Meanwhile, Rose falls in love with Flicker, who is unaware that the hitmen are coming to kill him.

Cast

References

External links
 
 He Was Her Man in the Internet Movie Database

1934 films
1934 crime drama films
1934 romantic drama films
American black-and-white films
American crime drama films
American romantic drama films
1930s English-language films
Films directed by Lloyd Bacon
Warner Bros. films
1930s American films
Films scored by Bernhard Kaun
Mafia films
Films about prostitution